Maroi Mezien (born 28 October 1988 in Tunis) is a Tunisian freestyle wrestler. She competed in the freestyle 48 kg event at the 2012 Summer Olympics; she was defeated in the 1/8 finals by Hitomi Obara and was eliminated in the repechage round by Isabelle Sambou.

References

External links
 

1988 births
Living people
Tunisian female sport wrestlers
Olympic wrestlers of Tunisia
Wrestlers at the 2012 Summer Olympics
Sportspeople from Tunis
African Wrestling Championships medalists
20th-century Tunisian women
21st-century Tunisian women